This is a list of electronic toll collection systems in use on toll roads throughout the world.

Africa

South Africa
Open Road (ORT) E-tolling on the Gauteng Freeway system started on 3 December 2013. The cost for the ETC system to toll 187 km of roads was R20bn. Electronic Toll Collection (Pty) Ltd (ETC), a subsidiary of Kapsch TrafficCom AG, is the contracted company that designed, built and is still operating the system, and in turn oversees the Transaction Clearing House (TCH) which oversees customer accounts, and the Violation Processing Centre (VPC) which will follow procedures against payment defaulters. Vehicles are identified electronically without any cash transactions taking place on the road or highway. Vehicle identification is facilitated by an e-tag or a vehicle license plate number which is recorded by overhead cameras installed on gantries, and interpreted by computer.

The system was widely denounced, and poor compliance affected SANRAL's credit rating. A public coalition known as 'Opposition to Urban Tolling Alliance', later renamed Organisation Undoing Tax Abuse (OUTA), launched initiatives to frustrate e-tolling's implementation, and a trade union, law firm and church were among the dissenting voices. OUTA believed the system to be unlawful and approached the high court in 2012, which ruled that the GFIP was lawfully instituted, but denied SANRAL a punitive costs order. In 2014 OUTA launched the Rule of Law campaign and promised to challenge the legality of procedures against payment defaulters.

In the first six months the overdue toll fees of unregistered road users accrued to R1 billion, and the Gauteng government acknowledged the dissatisfaction of motorists. Sanral CEO Skhumbuzo Macozoma confirmed in Sep 2020 that Gauteng’s e-toll compliance rate before the Covid-19 pandemic was at 20%, collecting only R60-million a month.

 e-toll operated by Sanral throughout the Gauteng province. Cities include Johannesburg, Pretoria, Centurion, Midrand, Soweto and the East and West Rand.
 Bakwena N1N4 Toll Concession The Bakwena N1N4 Toll is a separate system and has been operating for the past 12 years. The e-tag system employed by Sanral is also compatible with the current Bakwena tags and may be registered with Sanral's e-toll system for use on certain sections of the N1 and N4 towards Bela-Bela, Rustenburg and Botswana.
Since December 2015, the e-tag is operational on all toll roads nationally.

Asia

East Asia

China 
ETC has operated since June 2014. 13 provinces support ETC as of December 2014. As of December 2015, it works in 29 provinces. Plans vary by province and bank, and discounted rates (usually 5% off) may be available in some areas. The MoT scheduled to cancel all cross-provinces and cross-junctions toll booths in 2019, by renovating toll booths in all entries and exists, plus installing barrels (like how Electronic Road Pricing in Singapore works) on the province borders to fully support non-stop payments, and hence all such toll booths are cancelled by Jan 1, 2020.

Type of payment: prepaid card, some Chinese debit card (depends on at which bank one's ETC was opened), some Chinese credit cards (depends on at which bank one's ETC was opened), and (in some provinces) Alipay and WeChat pay. There usually an up front payment for new users. Wherever the Chinese ETC is opened, it is accepted nationwide as long as ETC is supported in that area.

Some emergency services vehicles, such as fire trucks and military vehicles, are also installed ETC e-tags by MEM and MND.

There's no known payment systems and toll booths for expressways in Hainan and Tibet, because:
 Management fees of Hainan expressways are combined with fuel surcharges, and hence instead of paying by drivers, such fees are dynamically paid by filling stations in Hainan;
 Expressways in Tibet are built by Tibetan PAPs, and are directly managed by State Council.

Hong Kong 

Covers toll roads and tunnels in Hong Kong; 220,000 users making 320,000 daily transactions.

Japan 
ETC started operation in 2001. It covers toll roads and tunnels in Japan; there are 6,000,000 daily transactions with a usage ratio of 90%.

South Korea 
hi-pass, operated by Korea Expressway Corporation, covers all national express roads and several BTO/BTL roads in South Korea. From 2013, transportation cards the (T-money, Cashbee, and Hanpay) are compatible with existing hi-pass system.

Taiwan 

Taiwan's ETC systems have been  operating since February 10, 2006. It transitioned from OBU (infrared-based) to e-Tag (passive RFID-based) MLFF as of 2012, and started live operations in December 2013.

Southwest Asia

South Asia

India 
FASTag is the electronic toll collection system in India, operated by the National Highway Authority of India (NHAI). It employs RFID for making toll payments directly from the prepaid or savings account linked to it or directly toll owner. It is affixed on the windscreen of the vehicle and enables to drive through toll plazas without stopping for transactions. FASTag has unlimited validity. Dedicated Lanes at some Toll plazas have been built for FASTag.
As of September 2019, FASTag lanes are available on over 500 national and state highways and over 35.23 million cars are enabled with FASTag. From 15 February 2021, FASTag was made mandatory for all vehicles and toll plazas in the country.

Pakistan 
M-Tag is the electronic toll collection system deployed on the motorways of Pakistan by One Network. It includes a system of automated and centrally connected electronic toll collection system utilizing the latest technology. 
https://onenetwork.pk/

Sri Lanka

Southeast Asia

Indonesia 
In the early 2010s Bank Mandiri introduced the e-Tollcard (now Mandiri e-money) contactless charge card, which monopolized the Electronic Toll Collection system in Indonesia's expressways for a time.

Since October 31, 2017 all expressways in Indonesia no longer accept cash tolls.

Toll booths only accept contactless charge cards as part of a greater "National Non-Cash Movement" (Gerakan Nasional Non Tunai, GNNT) organized by the central bank. As of the time of the switchover, charge cards issued by the four state-owned banks Bank Mandiri, BNI, BRI and BTN, as well as those issued by BCA, were accepted. There are currently plans for toll booths to accept more cards issued by different banks.

This is also a part of the Government of Indonesia's plan to eradicate toll booths and replace them with open-road tolling (officially called Multi-Lane Free Flow, MLFF by the government) similar to the ETC system in Taiwan.

Malaysia

Philippines 
There are two brands of RFID electronic toll collection systems in the country: Easytrip for expressways operated by Metro Pacific Investments and Autosweep for those operated by San Miguel Corporation. Both types were aimed to become interoperable sometime in 2020, as the Department of Transportation will start requiring users to register to either ETC system by January 2021 due to the COVID-19 pandemic. Currently, there are no plans for the country to use open road tolling.

Singapore

Thailand

Europe

British Isles 
 Ireland – eToll national standard
 Ireland – Eazy Pass National Toll Roads implementation of eToll
 United Kingdom – Dart-Tag for the Dartford Crossing
 United Kingdom – London congestion charge in London
 United Kingdom – Fast tag  Mersey tunnels: Queensway Tunnel and Kingsway Tunnel
 United Kingdom – M6 Toll tag in the Midlands
 United Kingdom – Severn TAG for the Severn Bridge crossing and Second Severn Crossing
 United Kingdom – Tamar Bridge
 United Kingdom – permit for the Tyne Tunnel linking North and South Tyneside
 United Kingdom — HumberTag, used on the Humber Bridge in North Lincolnshire and the East Riding of Yorkshire

Central Europe 
 Austria – Videomaut for motorways and expressways subject to special tolls (Sondermautstrecke)
 Austria – go-maut for the national Autobahn network (where passenger cars would require a vignette)
 Czech Republic – premid for trucks on highways
 Germany – LKW-MAUT for trucks on Autobahns
 Hungary – HU-GO, on all highways in Hungary for any vehicle
 Poland – e-TOLL mandatory for trucks over 3.5 tons and buses, optional for passenger cars
 Slovak Republic – SkyToll a. s. for vehicles over 3.5 tons total weight
 Slovenia – DarsGo (for vehicles over 3.5 tons)
 Switzerland – LSVA ("performance-related heavy vehicle fee")

Eastern Europe 
 Belarus – BelToll, on all tolled highways
 Russia – Flow+ (on Western Rapid Diameter, Saint Petersburg cross-city express motorway), Avtodor (on high-speed toll Moscow–Saint Petersburg motorway and toll shortcuts on M4 highway)

Northern Europe 
 Denmark/Sweden – BroBizz (EasyGo) for the Øresund, Great Belt and Crown Princess Mary's bridges
 Latvia - LVvignette
 Lithuania - e-vignette for vehicles over 3.5 tons and goods vehicles under 3.5 t (EU category N1)
 Norway – AutoPASS (EasyGo) on some ferries and all toll roads except the Atlantic Ocean Tunnel
 Sweden – Stockholm congestion tax in Stockholm, Gothenburg congestion tax in Gothenburg and infrastructure charge on Motala and Sundsvall bridges

Southeast Europe 
 Bosnia and Herzegovina – ACC, on all tolled motorways
 Bulgaria – TollPass, on all highways and first class roads for vehicles above 3.5 tons
 Romania – eTarif - Peaj, eRovinieta road tax mandatory for all automobiles 
 Serbia – ENP, on all tolled highways in Serbia
 Turkey – OGS (active onboard transponder, abbreviation for "Otomatik Gecis Sistemi") and HGS provider by Turkish Post (passive RFID, abbreviation for "Hizli Gecis Sistemi")

Southern Europe 
 Croatia – ENC, on all tolled motorways in Croatia (autocesta) except A2
 Italy – Telepass and UnipolMove on Autostrade motorways
 Portugal – Via Verde
 Portugal – Highways A22 (Algarve) and A28 (Porto) operated by Via Livre
 Spain – VIA-T, VIA-T Pagatelia, VIA-T Bip&Drive

Western Europe 
 Belgium – Kilometer charge for trucks on public roads
 France – Télépéage, usually branded liber-t on motorways (run by the Federation of French Motorway Companies) (ASFA)

North America

Canada 
 Maritime Provinces
 MACPASS in the Halifax Regional Municipality, Nova Scotia
 E-Pass at the Cobequid Pass, Cumberland County, Nova Scotia
 Strait Pass at the Confederation Bridge
 Ontario
 407 ETR/Highway 407E in the Greater Toronto Area 
 E-ZPass at the Peace Bridge and the Lewiston–Queenston Bridge
Quebec
 Le lien intelligent at the Olivier-Charbonneau Bridge (autoroute 25) crossing the Rivière des Prairies in Montreal
 A30 Express at the Pont Serge-Marcil (autoroute 30) crossing the Saint Lawrence River in the Montreal area

Costa Rica 
 Quick Pass lane uses E-Z Pass technology in all toll booths in the country.

Dominican Republic 
 Paso Rapido lane uses E-Z Pass technology in all toll booths in the country.

Mexico 
 IAVE is used on all the highways operated by Caminos y Puentes Federales (CAPUFE).

Puerto Rico 
 AutoExpreso, which is accepted at all Metropistas and Autopistas de Puerto Rico toll roads.

United States 
The 2012 transportation funding bill MAP-21 required all electronic tolling systems on Interstate highways be compatible by October 1, 2016, but no funding and no penalty were provided, so discussions on interoperability are ongoing through the International Bridge, Tunnel and Turnpike Association.
In Florida, older battery-powered SunPass transponders were no longer accepted as of January 1, 2016, in preparation for future compatibility with E-ZPass toll booths. Several mobile tolling platforms are currently in use.
 E-ZPass in Midwestern United States, Eastern United States, Florida and Minnesota
I-Pass in Illinois
NC Quick Pass in North Carolina
RiverLink system in Indiana and Kentucky for bridges over the Ohio River in the Louisville metro area. These presently include the formerly toll-free John F. Kennedy Bridge for southbound I-65, the Abraham Lincoln Bridge on northbound I-65, and the Lewis and Clark Bridge (including the East End Tunnel on the Kentucky approach) on IN 265/KY 841 (future extension of I-265 in both states). Motorists can obtain an E-ZPass transponder or a non-interoperable RiverLink one for use on RiverLink facilities only.
The E-ZPass system was branded as I-Zoom on the Indiana Toll Road from 2007 to 2012.
In Massachusetts, the E-ZPass system was branded as Fast Lane between 1998 and 2012. As of 2016, all toll facilities in Massachusetts use open-road tolling, and customers without transponders are charged a higher pay-by-plate rate.
On May 28, 2021, the Florida Turnpike Enterprise announced that its SunPass facilities would begin accepting E-ZPass. In addition, E-ZPass facilities began accepting SunPass Pro transponders (but not earlier SunPass transponders).
MnPass in Minnesota (to be rebranded into EZ-Pass starting on August 2, 2021)
Additionally, there are E-ZPass lanes in Ontario, Canada at the Peace Bridge (Canada-bound direction only) and the Lewiston-Queenston Bridge

Downbeach Express Pass on the Downbeach Express in New Jersey
E-PASS in Central Florida
North Carolina Quick Pass
Georgia PeachPass
Florida SunPass
Illinois I-Pass
E-ZPass
Uni Toll Pass (previously known as E-PASS Xtra)
Interoperable with:
Florida E-PASS
Florida SunPass
Georgia PeachPass
North Carolina QuickPass
Illinois I-Pass
Louisville RiverLink
E-ZPass
Express Pass in Utah
I-15 HOT lanes in the Salt Lake City area
EXpressToll network in Colorado
GO-PASS on Northwest Parkway
FasTrak in California
Freedom Pass in Alabama at the following locations:
Tuscaloosa Bypass
Montgomery Expressway
Emerald Mountain Expressway
Beach Express
GeauxPass in Louisiana
Good to Go in Washington state
In Michigan
MacPass at the Mackinac Bridge
Nexpress Toll at the Detroit-Windsor Tunnel
NationalPass, a system for providing a single transponder claimed to be compatible with all of the other systems listed here.
Palmetto Pass in South Carolina
Southeast interoperability area
NC Quick Pass in North Carolina
Peach Pass in Georgia
SunPass in Florida
LeeWay in Lee County
O-PASS in Osceola County
C-Pass in Key Biscayne was replaced by SunPass and pay-by-plate on September 23, 2014.
SunPass PRO has been launched and is interoperable with E-ZPass system in the north east
 South Plains interoperability area (North Texas Tollway Authority hub)
K-Tag in Kansas
Pikepass in Oklahoma
TxTAG in Texas
TollTag in Dallas
EZ TAG in Houston

Oceania

Australia 

 Airport Link Tunnel in Brisbane, Queensland
 Clem Jones Tunnel (Clem7) in Brisbane
 Gateway Motorway in Brisbane
 Go Between Bridge in Brisbane
 Logan Motorway in Brisbane
 Legacy Way Tunnel in Brisbane
 CityLink, in Melbourne, Victoria
 Eastlink, in Melbourne
 Sydney Harbour Bridge and Sydney Harbour Tunnel, in Sydney, New South Wales
 Eastern Distributor in Sydney
 M2 Hills Motorway, in Sydney
 M4 Western Motorway, in Sydney
 M5 South Western Motorway, in Sydney
 Westlink M7, in Sydney
 Cross City Tunnel, in Sydney
 Lane Cove Tunnel, in Sydney

New Zealand 
 Northern Gateway Toll Road on the Northern Motorway in Auckland
 Tauranga Eastern Link Toll Road on State highway 2 in Tauranga
 Takitimu Drive Toll road on State highway 29 in Tauranga

South America

Argentina 
 Autopistas Avenida General Paz and Acceso Norte in Buenos Aires system PASE (Peaje Automático Sin Espera)
 Autopistas 25 de Mayo, Dellepiane, Perito Moreno and Arturo Illia
 Autopista Ezeiza – Cañuelas
 Autopista Acceso Oeste
 Autopista La Plata – Buenos Aires
 Autopista Camino Parque del Buen Ayre
 Córdoba – Caminos de las sierras (CUIS)

Chile 
 Autopista Central in Santiago
 Autopista Vespucio Sur in Santiago
 Autopista Vespucio Norte Express in Santiago
 Costanera Norte in Santiago (world's first free-flow ETC freeway to cross through a downtown area)
 Túnel San Cristóbal in Santiago
 Acceso Sur de Santiago and Chile Highway 5 Santiago – Talca section
 Chile Route 68 in Santiago – Valparaíso and Santiago Viña del Mar
 International Highway Los Libertadores (Chilean section)
 Arturo Merino Benitez Road Access in Santiago

Brazil 
 Veloe
 ConectCar
 Sem Parar
 C6 Taggy

Colombia 
 Vial Del Valle in Cali

External links 
 Overview of European tolling systems
 Overview of international CEN and ISO electronic fee collection standards

References 

Electronic Toll